Agapito Conchu, also known as Agapito Concho (born 1895, date of death unknown) was a Filipino silent film director of the mid-1930s.

He was born in 1895 and made his directorial debut in the silent movie film Ang Magpapawid (The Roofmaker).

After the "talkies" came to the Philippines, he directed Mahiwagang Biyolin (The Magical Violin), which is a semi-fantasy movie together with a new face, Manuel Conde, who would become a great actor.

Conchu made one horror-flick, Sumpa ng Aswang (Curse of the Devil) with Monang Carvajal and a nationalistic film, Hagase Tu Voluntad.

He specialized in directing dramas, from his first movie Hatol ng Langit (Judged of Heaven) to Awit ng Pag-ibig (The Song of Love), Buhok ni Ester (The Hair of Ester) and Ama (Father) which was his last movie.

Filmography
1932 – Ang Magpapawid
1935 - Mahiwagang Biyolin
1935 - Hatol ng Langit
1935 - Awit ng Pag-ibig
1935 - Sumpa ng Aswang
1936 - Buhok ni Ester
1936 - Hagase Tu Voluntad
1936 - Ama

References
 

Filipino film directors
1895 births
Year of death missing